Thomas Manns (born January 1911 – unknown) was an English footballer. His regular position was at full back. He was born in Rotherham. He played for Manchester United, Burnley and Clapton Orient.

External links
 MUFCInfo.com profile

1911 births
People from Rotherham
English footballers
Manchester United F.C. players
Burnley F.C. players
Leyton Orient F.C. players
Year of death missing
Association football fullbacks